The  is a group of Satsumon culture burial mounds in the Motoebetsu neighbourhood of the city of Ebetsu, Hokkaidō, Japan. Dating from the late eighth and early ninth century, and the northernmost kofun known to-date, eighteen were jointly designated a National Historic Site in 1998.

Overview
The 1931 excavations uncovered sixteen burials, grave goods including blades (shō-tō, and tōsu), magatama, earrings, and earthernware spindle whorls. Subsequently, the burial mounds were indistinct.

In 1980 the site was investigated again. Of the burials previously excavated, other than for Mound 15, only the existence of the surrounding ditches could be confirmed, with all trace of the central arrangements for burial lost. In total, twenty-one burials were recorded, including those previously excavated; while Mounds 3, 4, and 5 have been lost to construction, the remaining eighteen have since been jointly designated an Historic Site.

Artefacts recovered from the various surrounding ditches include Haji ware, Sue ware, iron arrowheads, plough tips, and earthen spindle whorls, and, from Mound 15, a red Sue ware cup with a pair of handles and a Haji ware vessel black inside, from the ditch, and from the central area, teeth, the remains of a skull, and an iron artefact that is perhaps part of the hilt of a warabite-tō.

Significance
Nevertheless, both in its form, and in the nature and origin of many of its grave goods, the cluster attests to cultural exchange with Honshū and the continuation and influence of the  known from Tōhoku well beyond the end of the Kofun period and into the age of the Ritsuryō national state, and at the time more locally of the Satsumon culture.

See also
 List of Historic Sites of Japan (Hokkaidō)
 Hokkaido Archaeological Operations Center
 Ebetsu City Historical Museum
 Okhotsk culture
 Ishikari River

External links
 Okhotsk Culture and Satsumon Culture

References

Kofun
Archaeological sites in Japan
History of Hokkaido
Ebetsu, Hokkaido
Historic Sites of Japan